Carlos Zúñiga Figueroa (5 June 1885 – 1964) was a Honduran painter.

Biography 
Figueroa was born in Tegucigalpa, Honduras on June 5, 1885. He was the son of Manuel José Figueroa and Vicenta Zuñiga. He undertook an apprenticeship in typography and graphic arts at the National Typography of Tegucigalpa, later studying photography.  He gained a scholarship to study Art at the Royal Academy of Saint Fernando in Madrid. In 1913, he married Genoveva Vásquez, with whom he had 5 children. He died in 1964 in Honduras.

Artistic life 
1913, he became a technician at the National Typography of Tegucigalpa, the same institution he had undertaken his apprenticeship. In later years, he was appointed Director of the "Type-National Lithography", a position he held for seven years. The National Academy of Drawing was opened under his direction in 1934. In 1940, he became a teacher at the newly inaugurated National School of Fine Arts.

In 1951 he participated, by invitation of the Embassy of Spain, in the First Biennial Iberoamericana of Art at the Institute of Hispanic Culture in Madrid.

Memberships  
 Founding member of the "Honduran Casino".
 Artistic Director of the Athenaeum of Honduras.
 Member of the Honduran Masonic Lodge.

Recognitions 
 Gold medal, Exhibition of Art in Tegucigalpa, Honduras.
 Silver medal, Worldwide Fair of New York, United States of America.
 Medal of Honour, Exhibition of Art in San Francisco, California, United States of America.
 "Anthology of the Plastic Arts of Honduras" by the Cultural Centre of Spain in Tegucigalpa 2003.

Works 
 "Glorification of the General José Francisco Morazán Quezada".
 "Casería Of the General Morazán and the General Villaseñor" in San José, Costa Rica.
 "Portrait of the Doctor and General gift Tiburcio Carias Andean"
 "Painting of the National Theatre Manuel Bonilla

See also 
 Culture of Honduras
 Art in Honduras

References

Honduran painters
1964 deaths
1885 births
Honduran politicians
People from Tegucigalpa
20th-century painters